Sir John George Smyth Kinloch, 2nd Baronet (8 January 1849 – 20 May 1910) was a Scottish Liberal politician from Meigle. He was elected Member of Parliament for East Perthshire in 1889, resigning in 1903 by becoming Steward of the Manor of Northstead.

He was educated at Trinity College, Cambridge. On his 29th birthday, he married Jessie Montgomerie Lumsden. They had three sons and three daughters.

References

External links 
 

Members of the Parliament of the United Kingdom for Scottish constituencies
1849 births
1910 deaths
Alumni of Trinity College, Cambridge
UK MPs 1886–1892
UK MPs 1892–1895
UK MPs 1895–1900
UK MPs 1900–1906
Baronets in the Baronetage of the United Kingdom
Scottish Liberal Party MPs